Lady Seojeonwon was a Korean royal consort as the 22nd wife of Taejo of Goryeo. Among her husband's other wives, just she who can't know from what clan or who was her families. Because of this, some modern scholars expected and interpreted that her position within the Goryeo royal family was not very high.

References

Year of birth unknown
Year of death unknown
Consorts of Taejo of Goryeo